Top Gear is a racing video game series published by Kemco. It is unrelated to the BBC TV series of the same name.

Games

Console games
 Top Gear (SNES, 1992)
 Top Gear 2 (SNES, 1993)
 Top Gear 2 (SEGA GENESIS, 1994)
 Top Gear 3000 (SNES, 1995)
 Top Gear Rally (N64, 1997)
 Top Gear Overdrive (N64, 1998)
 Top Gear Rally 2 (N64, 1999)
 Top Gear Hyper Bike (N64, 2000)
 Top Gear: Dare Devil (PS2, 2000)
 RPM Tuning (PS2, 2004)

Handheld games
 Top Gear Pocket (GBC, 1999)
 Top Gear Pocket 2 (GBC, 2000)
 Top Gear GT Championship (GBA, 2001)
 Top Gear Rally (GBA, 2003)
 Top Gear Downforce (DS, 2006)

References

 
Video game franchises introduced in 1992
Kemco games